Shaper may refer to:

 Shaper, a metalworking tool
 Wood shaper, a woodworking tool
 Shaper (surfboard), a person who makes surfboards
 Waveshaper, an audio process
 Shaper, one of the roles in the Belbin Team Role Inventories
 a digital circut or program which performs Traffic shaping